The American Society of Primatologists is both an educational and scientific society which aims to promote both the discovery and exchange of information on non-human primates. The society is open to anybody who actively, or is more passively interested in primatology, or anyone who is interested in supporting this. The Society publishes a scientific journal, The American Journal of Primatology.

References

External links 
 American Society of Primatologists homepage

Primatology
Zoology organizations